Saidu Samaila Sambawa is a Nigerian politician. As a member of the Peoples Democratic Party, he headed the Federal Ministry of Sports and Social Development until the June 2006 cabinet reshuffle, when he was replaced by Bala Bawa Ka'oje.

References

Federal ministers of Nigeria
Living people
Year of birth missing (living people)